The Noin-Ula burial site (also Noyon Uul) consist of more than 200 large burial mounds, approximately square in plan, some 2 m in height, covering timber burial chambers.  They are located by the Selenga River in the hills of northern Mongolia north of Ulaan Baatar in Batsumber sum of Tov Province. They were excavated in 1924–1925 by Pyotr Kozlov, who found them to be the tombs of the aristocracy of the Xiongnu; one is an exceptionally rich burial of a historically known ruler of the Xiongnu, Wuzhuliu, who died in 13 CE. Most of the objects from Noin-Ula are now in the Hermitage Museum in Russia, while some artifacts unearthed later by Mongolian archaeologists are on display in the National Museum of Mongolian History, Ulaan Baatar. Two kurgans contained lacquer cups inscribed with Chinese characters believed to be the names of Chinese craftsmen, and dated September 5 year of Tsian-ping era, i.e. 2nd year BCE.

Discovery
The Noin-Ula burial site was first discovered in the spring of 1913 by Andrei Ballod, a Russian geologist doing survey work for a new gold-mining company. After discovering a number of already dug mounds, Ballod assumed they were old goldworkings and excavated one, uncovering a number of artifacts. Realizing the importance of his find, he sent some of the artifacts to the Imperial Russian Geological Society. While the find was recognized as significant, nothing was done for eleven years due to the chaos of the First World War and subsequent revolutions in Russia and Mongolia.

In 1924, Pyotr Kozlov was alerted to the find by a member of Ballod's team. After a colleague, Sergei Kondratiev, confirmed that the find was a major discovery, Kozlov changed his plans and eventually excavated eight mounds at the Noin-Ula site.

Noin-Ula kurgans
As with some finds of the Pazyryk culture, the Noin Ula graves had been flooded and subsequently frozen, thus preserving the organic material to a remarkable degree. The tombs were opened in antiquity and the bodies were removed. This corroborates the Han chronicles which state the leaders of one of the nomad tribes, oppressed by the Xiongnu at the height of their empire, took an unprecedented step 100 years after the decline of the Xiongnu. Wishing to unite their subjects, and driven by a desire for revenge, the new nomadic leaders desecrated the Chanyus' royal tombs. All the burials were unsealed, and the remains of the Chanyus were removed, together with some of their clothing, weaponry and symbols of authority. However, the robbers left Xiongnu weaponry, home utensils, and art objects, and Chinese artifacts of bronze, nephrite, lacquered wood and textiles. Many artifacts show origins along the Great Silk Road and some imported objects and fragments of fabrics are recognized as Greek. The fabric, color, weaving methods and embroidery of the cloth were similar to the fabric produced in the Greek colonies on the Black Sea coast for the Scythians.

Some tombs include horse burials and one tomb had especially lavish furnishings. The coffin was apparently made in China, and the interred person had many of his possessions buried with him. His horse trappings were elaborately decorated and his leather-covered saddle was threaded with black and red wool clipped to resemble velvet. Magnificent textiles included a woven wool rug lined with thin leather with purple, brown, and white felt appliqué work, and textiles of Greco-Bactrian, Parthian and Anatolian origin.

Wuzhuliu

Kurgan No 6 was the tomb of Wuzhuliu (烏珠留若提 Wuzhuliuruodi, reigned 8 BCE–13 CE), who is mentioned in the Chinese annals. He is famous for freeing his people from the Chinese protectorate that lasted 56 years, from 47 BCE to 9 CE. Wuzhuliu was buried in 13 CE, a date established from the inscription on a cup given to him by the Chinese Emperor during a reception in the Shanlin park near Chang'an in 1 BCE.

The most dramatic objects of Wuzhuliu's funeral inventory are the textiles, of local, Chinese and Bactrian origin. The art objects show that Xiongnu craftsmen used the Scythian "animal" style.

A surviving portrait shows a low nose bridge, eyes with epicanthic fold, long wavy hair, divided in the middle, and a braid visibly tied and falling from the tip of the head over the right ear. Such braids were found in other kurgan tombs in the Noin Ula cemetery, they were braided from horsehair, and kept in special cases. The braid was a part of a formal hairstyle, and the braid resembles the death-masks of the Tashtyk. From these observations, L.N. Gumilev concluded that among the Xiongnu of the 1st century BC, a far-eastern ideal of beauty overcame the traditional western model, which continued in the art of the Scythian "animal" style.

Embroidened carpets

Among the most important artifacts from Noin-Ula are embroidered portrait images. The portraits are not made in the Chinese manner, and are the handiwork of a Central Asian or Scythian artist, or perhaps of a Bactrian or Parthian master in the capital of the Chanyus (who had active diplomatic relations with these Central Asian states).

It has been claimed that the portraits depict Greco-Bactrians, or are Greek depictions of Scythian soldiers from the Black Sea. According to Sergey Yatsenko, the carpets were made by the Yuezhi in Bactria, and were obtained by the Xiongnu through commercial exchange or tributary payment, as the Yuezhi may have remained tributaries of the Xiongnu a long time following their defeat. Embroidered carpets were one of the highest prized luxury items for the Xiongnu.

Anthropology
The Noin-Ula burials were intensively studied, but because the cemetery was desecrated in antiquity and bodies removed, no craniological, odontological, or genetic studies could be conducted. One exception is the odontological study of preserved enamel caps of seven permanent teeth belonging to a young woman. The study describes highly diagnostic traits with a very rare combination found in certain ancient and modern populations of the Caspian–Aral region and in the northern Indus–Ganges interfluve. A Parthian woolen cloth in the grave indicates that the woman was of northwestern Indian origin associated with the Parthian culture. The finds suggest that at the beginning of the Common Era, peoples of Parthian origin were incorporated within Xiongnu society.

See also 

 Pazyryk burials

References

Further reading

 S. S. Minyaev. To the interpretation of some finds from Noyon uul //Ancient Cultures of Eurasia. St-Petersburg, 2010: 182-186.
 Sergei Miniaev, Julia Elikhina. On the Chronology of the Noyon uul Barrows// The Silk Road 7 (2009): 21-35
 V. E. Kulikov, E. Iu. Mednikova, Iu. I. Elikhina, S. S. Miniaev. AN EXPERIMENT IN STUDYING THE FELT CARPET FROM NOYON UUL BY THE METHOD OF POLYPOLARIZATION// The Silk Road 8 (2010): 73-78.
 V. N. Kononov. Vosstanovlenie pervonachal’nykh krasok kovra iz Noin-Ula [Restoration of the
original colors of a carpet from Noyon uul]. Moscow-Leningrad, 1937.
 Kratkie otchety ekspeditsii po issledovaniiuSevernoi Mongolii v sviazi s Mongolo-Tibetskoi
ekspeditsii P. K. Kozlova [Brief reports of the expedition to study Northern Mongolia
in conjunction with the Mongolia-Tibetan expedition of P. K. Kozlov]. Leningrad, 1925.
 S. S. Miniaev. “Bronzovye izdeliia Noin-Uly (po rezul’tatam spektral’nogo analiza) [Bronze
artefacts of Noyon uul (results of spectroscopic analysis)]. //Kratkie soobshcheniia Instituta
arkheologii 167 (1981):
 A. A. Voskresenskii and V. N. Kononov. "Khimiko-tekhnologicheskii analiz kovra No. 14568" [Technical chemical analysis of carpet no. 14568]. In: Tekhnologicheskoe izuchenie tkanei kurgannykh pogrebenii Noin-Ula [Technical study of the fabrics from the burial barrows of Noyon uul]. Izvestiia GAIMK, XI/vyp. 7-9. Leningrad, 1932: 76–98.
 Trever C. "Excavations in Northern Mongolia (1924–1925)", Leningrad: J. Fedorov Printing House, 1932
 Rudenko S.I. "Hun Culture and Noin Ula kurgans", M-L, 1962 (In Russian)
 Rudenko S.I., Gumilev L.N., "Archaeological Studies of P.K.Kozlov from standpoint of historical geography", in News of All-Union Geographical Society No 3, 1966 (In Russian)
 Gumilev L.N., "History of Hun People", 'Eastern Literature', 1960, Ch. 12 Regained Freedom http://gumilevica.kulichki.net/HPH/hph12.htm
 N. Ishjatms, "Nomads In Eastern Central Asia", in the "History of civilizations of Central Asia", Volume 2, UNESCO Publishing, 1996, 
http://xiongnu.atspace.com
http://eurasica.xiongnu.ru
 Video: Xiongnu – the burial site of the Hun prince (Mongolia) Video-Documentation in 10 Episodes

Archaeological sites in Mongolia
Xiongnu